This is a list of singles that have peaked in the Top 10 of the Billboard Hot 100 during 1989.

New Kids on the Block scored six top ten hits during the year with "You Got It (The Right Stuff)", "I'll Be Loving You (Forever)", "Hangin' Tough", "Cover Girl", "Didn't I (Blow Your Mind)", and "This One's for the Children", the most among all other artists.

Top-ten singles

1988 peaks

1990 peaks

See also
 1989 in music
 List of Hot 100 number-one singles of 1989 (U.S.)
 Billboard Year-End Hot 100 singles of 1989

References

General sources

Joel Whitburn Presents the Billboard Hot 100 Charts: The Eighties
Joel Whitburn Presents the Billboard Hot 100 Charts: The Nineties
Additional information obtained can be verified within Billboard's online archive services and print editions of the magazine.

1989
United States Hot 100 Top 10